Jorge Romo Fuentes (20 April 1923 – 17 June 2014) was a Mexican football midfielder who played for Mexico in the 1954 and 1958 FIFA World Cups. He also played for Club Deportivo Marte and Deportivo Toluca.

References

External links

1924 births
Mexico international footballers
Association football midfielders
Deportivo Toluca F.C. players
1954 FIFA World Cup players
1958 FIFA World Cup players
Footballers from Mexico City
2014 deaths
Mexican footballers
Liga MX players